Daza may refer to 
Toubou people in northern Africa
Daza language
Dazawa language also known as Daza, spoken in Nigeria
Daza (surname)
Daza (cicada), a genus in subfamily Cicadettinae
Maximinus Daza, Roman emperor from 310 to 313

Language and nationality disambiguation pages